Valle de Hecho (Val d'Echo in Aragonese language) is a municipality located in the province of Huesca, Aragon, Spain. According to the 2004 census (INE), the municipality has a population of 984 inhabitants.

Villages
Siresa
Embún
Urdués 
Santa Lucía
Siresa.

See also
Jacetania
Abbey of San Pedro de Siresa
Rosario Ustáriz Borra

References

Municipalities in the Province of Huesca